Jimmy Ndhlovu (born 18 December 1992) is a Zambian football striker who currently plays for Kabwe Warriors F.C.

References

1992 births
Living people
Zambian footballers
Zambia international footballers
Red Arrows F.C. players
ZESCO United F.C. players
Nkana F.C. players
Power Dynamos F.C. players
Kabwe Warriors F.C. players
Association football forwards